Mystery Hour is the second studio album by American indie pop band Pavo Pavo. It was released on January 25, 2019 through Bella Union.

Track listing

References

2019 albums
Bella Union albums
Pavo Pavo albums